Silvia Guignard Schnyder (born 6 August 1974) is a Swiss sport shooter.

She participated at the 2018 ISSF World Shooting Championships, winning a medal.

References

External links

Living people
1974 births
Swiss female sport shooters
ISSF rifle shooters
21st-century Swiss women